Mbatha is a surname. Notable people with the surname include: 

 Azaria Mbatha (born 1941), South African artist
 Gugu Mbatha-Raw (born 1983), British actress
 Lindokuhle Mbatha (born 1985), South African footballer
 Nomzamo Mbatha (born 1990), South African actress, television personality, and human rights activist

Bantu-language surnames